In alphabetical order, this is a list of famous people who died of pneumonia.

Notes

External links
World Pneumonia Day

Pneumonia